23 may refer to:
23 (number), the natural number following 22 and preceding 24
 one of the years 23 BC, AD 23, 1923, 2023

Films 
23 (film), a 1998 German film
The Number 23, a 2007 film starring Jim Carrey

Music 
23, a German rap duo composed of Bushido and Sido

Albums 
23 (23 album), 2011, by German rappers Bushido and Sido alias 23
23 (Blonde Redhead album), 2007
23 (Rythem album), the third album from the Japanese duo, Rythem
23 (Shadow Child EP), 2012, featuring Tymer
23 (The Silents EP), 2007
23 (mixtape), 2022, the second mixtape by Central Cee
Untitled #23, a 2009 album by The Church
Twentythree, a 2005 album by Tristan Prettyman
Twentythree, by the band Carbon Based Lifeforms

Songs 
"23" (Mike Will Made It song), featuring Miley Cyrus, Wiz Khalifa and Juicy J
"23" (Sam Hunt song)
"Twenty-Three" (song), by IU
"23", a song by German rap duo 23 (Bushido and Sido) from the album 23
"23", a song by Blonde Redhead from 23
"23", a song by Jimmy Eat World from their 2004 album Futures
"23", a song by Maluma from F.A.M.E
"23", a song by Saweetie from High Maintenance
"23", a song by Shakira from Shakira
"23", a song by Simon Neale as Shadow Child
"23", a song by The Silents from 23
 "23", a song by Chase Atlantic from Part Three
"Twenty Three", a song by Big John
"Twenty Three", a song by Duffy
"Twentythree" by Yellowcard
"Twenty-Three, for 13 violins, 5 violas & 5 cellos", a 1988 composition by John Cage
"Twenty Three", a song by Karma to Burn from the album Arch Stanton, 2014

Other uses 
 23 (Will & Grace), a 2003 episode of the sitcom
 23 (numerology) or 23 enigma, a superstitious belief in the significance of the number 23
 The Number 23 (Ugly Betty episode) or East Side Story, 2007
 23 Stirling–St Andrews, a withdrawn bus service in Scotland

See also
 23 skidoo (disambiguation)
 List of highways numbered 23
 Line 23 (disambiguation)